Umbre is a Romanian crime drama television series produced by HBO Europe and directed by Bogdan Mirică and Igor Cobileanski. It is the first HBO Europe original series to be broadcast in the United States and the first TV series to be screened at the Transilvania International Film Festival. The second season was nominated for the Best TV CEE Series award at the Serial Killer festival.

The second season premiered on 12 November 2017 in 19 countries. In September 2018, it was announced that the series had been renewed for a third season consisting of 7 episodes, with filming to begin in Fall On October 10, 2019, it was announced that the premiere date for the third season is November 20. The entire third season will be streamed on HBO Go on November 20 while on TV it will be aired weekly.

Plot
Umbre follows Relu (Șerban Pavlu), an enforcer for a small-time Romanian mob boss (Doru Ana), as he struggles to keep his family in the dark about his job. The series starts off when Relu out on a mission accidentally kills a man. Day by day, the secrets he keeps become increasingly oppressive and the lies begin to surface, one by one.

Characters 
AUREL “RELU” ONCESCU (Serban Pavlu)

Relu is a family man and a reliable friend. He is married to Gina with whom he has two children, Chuckie and Magda. They're living together with Uncle Puiu, who, although not a relative, is treated as a member of their family.

Seen through the eyes of his family, Relu Oncescu seems to be an ordinary taxi driver. No one suspects that he's actually working as an enforcer for The Captain, a local mobster. In order to provide his family with a better life, Relu recovers money from debtors and in order to be successful, most often than not, he has to resort to threats and violence.

Because he is neither criminal nor a psychopath, he has never managed to advance in the hierarchy, always doing the others' dirty work. After accidentally killing a man, he tries to get out of the underworld, but he cannot find a way back, and his life will change forever.

GINA ONCESCU (Maria Obretin)

Gina is Relu's wife, an extremely loyal woman who gave up any personal aspirations in order to devote herself completely to her husband and two children. She loves her husband passionately after many years of marriage and she's ready to do anything to protect her family. She is a skilled housewife, focused on everyday work: cooking, washing, ironing, cleaning and maintaining the flame of passion alive in her relationship. When she finds out that her husband is leading a double life and has lied to her for years, her universe crumbles and her reactions become unpredictable.

UNCLE PUIU (Ștefan Velniciuc)

Uncle Puiu is a member of Relu's family. He's living in the same backyard with the Oncescu family, in a modest room that still bears traces of his tumultuous life. He's ready to do everything for Relu, Gina and their children. In his youth, he used to be one of the elite players of one of the most important clans of the underworld but, on the surface, he's been retired for years without losing the esteem of the current bosses. He is the only one who knows about Relu's double life and he covers for him every time. Despite his old age, he still goes to the old sentimental prostitutes he used to protect.

Uncle Puiu is Relu's mentor and the unofficial grandfather of his children.

NICOLETA (NICO) (Andreea Vasile)

Nico is The Captain's (Relu's boss) right hand and the one coordinating the enforcers. She owns a pub which is named after her and where she hosts the meetings of the local mobsters. Nico is a product of this world and she made her way up in the hierarchy carefully and skillfully: she dresses provocatively and she's always top notch. She has a weakness for Relu but, despite all her efforts, he is not interested.

THE CAPTAIN (Doru Ana)

The Captain is the brain behind all the illegal operations and he is respected and feared by the entire underworld. He knows everything that happens and he's rarely caught by surprise. He's a megalomaniac, apparently full of charisma and affection when, in fact, he exhibits boundless cruelty and an enormous appetite for life manifested in everlasting parties which he organizes as rewards for his "boys". He does not trust anyone and easily betrays his partners.

His only sorrow is caused by Teddy, his only son, who does not live up to his expectations and whom he considers too weak to ever follow in his footsteps.

CHUCKIE (Dan Hurduc)

Relu and Gina's younger son and Uncle Puiu's favourite. Chuckie is a quiet and clever boy, who loves dinosaurs and who has all the data to become a very good swimmer. He seldom worries his parents. However, when there are problems in the family, the youngest member's reactions are surprising.

MAGDA (Mădălina Craiu)

Magda is an intelligent young woman who dreams about being independent though her much too severe father holds her on a tight leash.  Always fighting with him, Magda will do her best to ignore him and his decisions.

TEDDY (Gabriel Huian)

The Captain's only son has passions which seem unacceptable for his local mafia boss of a father: he's listening to classical music, he's an avid reader and he speaks perfect Romanian, often correcting those he comes in contact with. After he meets Relu for the first time, their destinies merge and Teddy shows he's capable of unexpected gestures and decisions.

SABIN (Sergiu Costache)

Sabin is one of The Captain's boys and he's often sent into missions with Relu. Unlike Relu, however, Sabin has a tough physique and personality and he's vindictive and cruel. He envies Relu for the latter's relationship with The Captain and suspects that there is something between Relu and Nico, for whom he has strong feelings.

TOMA (Dorel Vișan)

The most powerful and most feared underworld figure, Toma is the only one who can impose conditions on The Captain. He lets the latter wait for him or he shows up when least expected because his status allows it.

Episodes

Season 1 (2014-15)
Relu (Șerban Pavlu) is a family man. He has a wife, two children and he leads a double life.

Seen through the eyes of his family, Relu Oncescu seems to be an ordinary taxi driver. No one suspects that Relu works as a collector for Căpitanu’, a local mobster.

Neither of the worlds (family and Mafia) he is living in knows about the other. Relu manages to keep everything under control, but not for long. After he accidentally kills a man, he tries to escape the underground world, but he is not able to find a way out.

With each passing day the secrets become more and more overwhelming and the lies start coming to light one by one.

Season 2 (2017) 
Relu Oncescu and his wife, Gina, are separated. Relu's two lives are violently intertwined. Their daughter marries The Captain's son, The Captain being the mobster Relu works for. The young couple are expecting a child. Old quarrels are catching up with the children and the parents. Everything has a price in the underground world.

Time has passed by and the affairs of The Captain's clan have become increasingly more important and thus more suspicious in the eyes of a prosecutor who wants to nail them. Everything is threatened. Relu wants to get revenge and nothing will stand in his way. He is ready to sacrifice everything to seek justice.

Season 3 (2019)
On May 14, 2019, it was announced that the filming for the third season has ended and that the series would return in the fall. The first episode of the third season premiered at the Transilvania International Film Festival on June 6.
The third season will premiere on November 20 and it will have 7 episodes.

After coming face to face with Emilian last season, the third Umbre installment sees Relu engaging in the full-on hunt deployed against him, using anything, and anyone, to stay one step ahead of his nemesis. It's not just his own freedom that's on the line, but the entire empire of his mobster family, which is now on track to go global. While The Captain is striving to hold on to the business, his brother Nicu steers it into international waters, with Relu's help. Nico has become a pawn on the chessboard where Emilian and Relu try to outwit each other, and playing both sides will wear them to a frazzle this season. Relu's family is unraveling and, with Gina seeing Sebastian, Chuckie spiraling out of control, and Magda coming to grips with the loss of her baby, there's no thread in sight to pull it back together. Is Relu even trying to anymore?

Production

The first season of Umbre is based on Small Time Gangster, an Australian comedy series, while the second season is completely original.
There was an almost three-year gap between season one and two because Bogdan Mirica directed his debut feature film Dogs, which was awarded the FIPRESCI Prize in 2016 Cannes Un Certain Regard.
The second season features 6 episodes but of greater length (almost one hour per episode, compared to 45 minutes in the first season). 
The Visual effects for the second season are created by Stargate Studios, company that produces visual effects for The Walking Dead, among other TV series.

Broadcast

Umbre premiered in Romania on 28 December 2014 (HBO Romania). On 9 November 2015 it premiered on Acorn TV, making it the first HBO Europe original series to be broadcast in the United States. In 2017, the first season of Umbre was acquired by Amazon Prime and Hulu for streaming.
The second season premiered at the 2018 Transilvania International Film Festival, marking the first television series to be screened at this film festival and on 12 November 2017 it had its TV premiere in 19 European countries where HBO operates: Romania, Poland, Bulgaria, Hungary, Croatia, Moldova, Macedonia, Czech Republic, Montenegro, Macedonia, Serbia, Slovenia, Slovakia, Bosnia and Herzegovina, and also Denmark, Sweden, Norway, Finland and Spain.

References

External links
 
 

Romanian drama television series
Romanian-language television shows
HBO Europe original programming